"A Little Too Late" is a song written by Gary Barlow, Delta Goodrem, and Eliot Kennedy, produced by True North Records for Goodrem's second album, Mistaken Identity (2004). It was released as the album's fourth single in Australia on 30 May 2005 as a CD single and reached number 13 on the ARIA Singles Chart.

Chart performance
The song was Goodrem's 10th single to chart on the Australian ARIA Singles Chart, peaking at number 13. It was Delta's first song since her 2001 single, "I Don't Care", to not enter the top 10. After its debut at number 13, the song fell down the charts, leaving the top 20 after two weeks and spending 10 weeks in the top 50.

Music video

The song's music video was directed by Anthony Rose at Point Piper, Sydney, Australia. The video was criticised by Channel V host Yumi Stynes for "resembling a tampon commercial".

Track listing
Australian CD single
 "A Little Too Late"
 "The Riddle"
 "If I Forget" (demo mix)
 "A Little Too Late" (video)

Charts

References

External links
 Song lyrics

2005 singles
2004 songs
Daylight Records singles
Delta Goodrem songs
Epic Records singles
Songs written by Delta Goodrem
Songs written by Eliot Kennedy
Songs written by Gary Barlow